Sam Darling (11 March 1852 – 16 May 1921) was a British racehorse trainer. He was a trainer at Beckhampton, Wiltshire and trained two Derby winners, Galtee More and Ard Patrick. He wrote an autobiography titled Sam Darling's Reminisces.

His son Fred (1884–1953) took over his stables and had further success.

References

British racehorse trainers
1852 births
1921 deaths